Sunkoshi Hydropower Station (Nepali: सुनकोशी जलविद्युत आयोजना) is a run-of-river hydro-electric plant located in Sindhupalchok District of Nepal. The flow from Sunkoshi River is used to generate 10.05 MW electricity.  The plant is owned and developed by Government owned company, the Nepal Electricity Authority. The plant started generating electricity since 1972 ( 2028 BS). 

The power station is connected to the national grid.

The project was built as a gift from China to Nepal.

Events
 In 2014 Sunkoshi blockage, the intake of the project was damaged.

See also
List of power stations in Nepal

References

Hydroelectric power stations in Nepal
Gravity dams
Run-of-the-river power stations
Dams in Nepal
Buildings and structures in Sindhupalchowk District